Sir Roger William Houssemayne Du Boulay  (20 March 1922 – 14 April 2020) was a British diplomat who served as Vice-Marshal of the Diplomatic Corps.

Du Boulay was educated at Winchester College and New College, Oxford. On 6 November 1942 he was commissioned into the Royal Air Force Volunteer Reserve, and saw active service in the Second World War. On 28 February 1947 he was promoted to Flight Officer. He relinquished his commission on 28 February 1957.

After the war Du Boulay joined the Colonial Service, and served in Nigeria between 1949 and 1958. In 1959 he joined Her Majesty's Diplomatic Service, and held appointments in Washington, the Foreign Office, Manila and Paris. From 1973 to 1975 he was Resident Commissioner of the New Hebrides. He was made a Companion of the Order of St Michael and St George in the 1975 Birthday Honours. On 12 December 1975 he became Vice-Marshal of the Diplomatic Corps, retaining the post until 9 April 1982. He was knighted in the Royal Victorian Order in 1982, having been made a CVO in 1972. He later served as an adviser to the Solomon Islands and Swaziland governments.

He died in April 2020 at the age of 98.

References

External links 
 Memoir of the British Embassy in Paris, 1971-1973, by Sir Roger du Boulay

1922 births
2020 deaths
Alumni of the University of Oxford
Members of HM Diplomatic Service
Civil servants in the Colonial Office
Companions of the Order of St Michael and St George
Knights Commander of the Royal Victorian Order
Members of the British Royal Household
People educated at Winchester College
Royal Air Force officers
Royal Air Force Volunteer Reserve personnel of World War II
Resident Commissioners of the New Hebrides (United Kingdom)
British expatriates in Nigeria
British expatriates in the United States
British expatriates in the Philippines
British expatriates in France
British expatriates in the Solomon Islands
Roger
Expatriates in Eswatini
20th-century British diplomats